Molina di Quosa is a village in Tuscany, central Italy, administratively a frazione of the comune of San Giuliano Terme, province of Pisa.

Bibliography

References 

Frazioni of the Province of Pisa